The 1993 UCI Road World Cup was the fifth edition of the UCI Road World Cup. It was won by Italian classics specialist Maurizio Fondriest of the  team.

Races

Final standings

Individual

Team

References

External links
Complete results from Cyclingbase.com
 Final classification for individuals and teams from memoire-du-cyclisme.eu

 
 
UCI Road World Cup (men)